Barre is a form of physical exercise, usually conducted in group classes in gyms or specialty studios. It is distinguished from other group fitness activities by its use of the ballet barre and its incorporation of movements derived from ballet. These classical dance movements and positions are combined with those drawn from yoga and pilates, and other equipment is sometimes used in addition to the barre, such as resistance bands, yoga straps, exercise balls and hand weights. Barre classes typically focus on small, pulsing movements with emphasis on form, alignment and core engagement. Participants hold their bodies still while contracting specific, targeted sets of muscles in isometric exercises. Repetitions tend to be high, range-of-motion small, and weights, when used, light (1–1.5kg or 2–3 pounds).  Barre classes focus on the lower body and core, developing strength and flexibility from the ankles up though the calves, knees, thighs, glutes and abdominals. Holding muscles in contraction for extended periods frequently leads to them shaking as they fatigue. This is particularly true of thighs, as the quadriceps tire.

Participants wear activewear similar to that worn in yoga classes, and do the exercises either in bare feet or in socks. Some specialized socks ("grip socks") include non-slip features to increase traction.

History 
Barre was created by the ballerina Lotte Berk in London in 1959. After injuring her back, Berk got the idea of combining her ballet barre routines with her rehabilitative therapy to form an exercise system. In 1959 she opened The Lotte Berk Studio in her West End basement.  She numbered Joan Collins and Barbra Streisand among her students.

One of Berk's students, Lydia Bach, brought barre to the United States. She opened the Lotte Berk Method studio in New York City in 1971, where it operated until 2005. Instructors from the studio went on to found some of the major chains providing barre classes, including Physique 57, The Bar Method, and Exhale Spa.

Barre rapidly expanded in popularity in the 2010s. By 2015, the Pure Barre chain alone had nearly 300 studios in the United States, and The Bar Method had over 80.  The Los Angeles based chain Pop Physique popularized Barre by appealing to a younger urban hipster demographic, opening studios In Los Angeles, New York, and San Francisco. Niki Rein brought barre to the UK with her London-based chain, Barrecore. Sadie Lincoln, co-founder of the barre3 chain of studios attributes the growth of popularity of barre to people wanting smaller, more connected fitness classes in the economic climate following the Global Financial Crisis. Tanya Becker, co-founder of the Physique 57 chain suggests that the appeal of barre is that classes deliver well-rounded exercise in a short space of time. The American Council on Exercise noted a rise in popularity of barre classes after the release of the 2010 movie Black Swan.

Benefits
Barre classes attract people who want to develop the lean muscle tone of a ballerina. Supposed benefits include improved strength, posture, flexibility, balance, stability, endurance, and muscle definition, together with weight loss and reduced stress. The exercises target muscles that support and stabilise the body and which are often neglected in everyday life and by other forms of exercise. 

Beyond purely physical goals, barre develops control and a particular aesthetic.

Criticisms and risks
One criticism of barre is that strength gains from small, isometric exercises do not build functional strength in the same way that compound movements common in traditional strength training do, because many of the movements used in barre class are not used anywhere but in dance. Furthermore, isometric movements are less effective than compound movements at encouraging muscle fibre growth and increased metabolic rate that will help reach weight loss goals. 

Neither are barre classes as effective as traditional aerobics classes at building cardio-vascular fitness, typically only raising heart rates to 40–50% of maximum. In terms of energy output, barre typically does not burn many calories and its energy demands more closely resemble walking than running.

Some barre classes adopt the ballet aesthetic of keeping the lower back straight, achieved by tucking the pelvis. This practice can lead to back pain and related injuries. The balletic plié movement used in many barre classes relies on bending the knee outwards with the legs rotated away from the centreline of the body. The pressure this places on the knees can increase the risk of knee injury, particularly if someone chooses to goes running immediately after a barre class.

Classes and branded studios 
Many studio regional, national and international studios promote workouts based on traditional barre exercises. Unbranded barre workouts are also taught in gyms and independent studios around the world. Prominent brands include:

 The Bar Method
 Pure Barre
 Pop Physique
 Cardio Barre
 Physique 57
 The Dailey Method
 BodyBarre
 Barre3
 Ballet Beautiful
 FlyBarre (now defunct)
 Core Fusion

References 

Physical exercise
Bodyweight exercises
Dance and health